Christian Ariel Smigiel (born March 3, 1977 in Quilmes (Buenos Aires), Argentina) is a former Argentine footballer who played for clubs of Argentina and Chile.

Teams
  Temperley 1997-2000
  Instituto de Córdoba 2000-2002
  Gimnasia y Esgrima de Jujuy 2002-2003
  Talleres de Córdoba 2003-2004
  Huachipato 2005
  Defensores de Cambaceres 2006-2007

References
 Profile at BDFA 
 

1977 births
Living people
Argentine footballers
Argentine expatriate footballers
Club Atlético Temperley footballers
Defensores de Cambaceres footballers
Gimnasia y Esgrima de Jujuy footballers
Talleres de Córdoba footballers
Instituto footballers
C.D. Huachipato footballers
Chilean Primera División players
Expatriate footballers in Chile
Association footballers not categorized by position
People from Quilmes
Sportspeople from Buenos Aires Province